Robert Sidney Baker (27 October 1916 – 30 September 2009) was a British film and television producer, who at times was also a cinematographer and director. Born in London and serving as an artillery man in the British Army, he was posted to North Africa, where he became involved in the army's film and photographic unit, later serving as a combat cameraman in Europe.

Movie career 
Despite a prolific film and television career, Baker was principally known for his long-time professional relationship with Monty Berman, where they founded Tempean Films, churning out comedies, thrillers, and mysteries. Some of their more popular work included Jack the Ripper, The Siege of Sidney Street, The Hellfire Club, and The Secret of Monte Carlo. Later, he was to be involved with nearly every filmed usage of the Leslie Charteris creation, The Saint, and produced The Persuaders!.

Death 
Baker died on 30 September 2009.

Selected filmography
 Melody Club (1949)
 No Trace (1950)
 13 East Street (1952)
 The Voice of Merrill (1952)
 The Steel Key (1953)
 Double Exposure (1954)
 Sea of Sand (1958)

External links

The Morning After ITC fan site
Television Heaven fan site on The Saint
Robert S Baker - The Guardian obituary
 Robert Baker – Daily Telegraph obituary

ITC Entertainment
1916 births
2009 deaths
Military personnel from London
British film producers
English film producers
British cinematographers
English cinematographers
English television producers
British television producers
British Army personnel of World War II
Royal Artillery personnel
20th-century English businesspeople